Sebastián Ernesto Pereira Arredondo (born 14 January 1999) is a Chilean professional footballer who plays as a centre-back for Everton de Viña del Mar.

Career
In June 2022, he was loaned to Unión La Calera by Everton de Viña del Mar until the end of the season.

Career statistics

References

1999 births
Living people
Sportspeople from Valparaíso
Chilean footballers
Association football central defenders
Chilean Primera División players
Everton de Viña del Mar footballers
Unión La Calera footballers